Charles Brown (born October 29, 1958) is an American former professional football player who was a wide receiver in the National Football League (NFL) for six seasons. He played for the Washington Redskins, helping them win Super Bowl XVII in his rookie season, and Atlanta Falcons.  He was traded by the Redskins to the Falcons on August 26, 1985, in exchange for Pro Bowl guard R.C. Thielemann. He was nicknamed "Good ol' Charlie Brown" in reference to the eponymous comic strip character.

He played college football at South Carolina State University and was drafted in the eighth round of the 1981 NFL Draft. Brown played wide receiver and defensive back for the Washington Commandos of the Arena Football League in 1990. He was a receiver for the short-lived Washington Marauders of the Professional Spring Football League in 1992. Brown was head coach of the Savannah High Blue Jackets (Savannah, Georgia) of the Savannah Chatham County Football League.

He is currently wide receivers coach of Marlboro County High School Bulldogs varsity football team in Bennettsville, South Carolina.

References

External links
NFL stats

1958 births
Living people
Sportspeople from Charleston, South Carolina
American football wide receivers
South Carolina State Bulldogs football players
Washington Redskins players
Atlanta Falcons players
National Conference Pro Bowl players
Washington Commandos players
African-American players of American football
21st-century African-American people
20th-century African-American sportspeople